Wars and Rumors of Wars is the third full-length album from the band The Chariot. The album is unique in that, the first 25,000 CD cases were hand stamped, signed and numbered by the band, every member stamping 5,000 each. Similarly, the first 300 were stamped in red ink for a special pre-order. They have stated this was done because they felt that CDs were becoming too impersonal, meaning that bands did not have much to do with a CD after the recording was finished, as the artwork would be designed by someone else, and then the whole package would be sent to the printer. The album is the only release by the band to feature guitarists Dan Vokey and Brian Russell Taylor.

Track listing
All lyrics written by Josh Scogin and composed by The Chariot

Personnel 
The Chariot
 Josh Scogin - vocals
 Dan Vokey - guitar
 Bryan Russell Taylor - guitar
 Jon "KC Wolf" Kindler - bass
 David Kennedy – drums

Additional Instrumentation
Jeff Gingrich - Cello ("Never I")

Trivia 
 There is a hidden message in the song titles. If you take the first and last letter of each song title and lay them out, it spells "The end is nigh and so am I".

References

External links
Wars and Rumors of Wars website

2009 albums
The Chariot (band) albums
Solid State Records albums
Tooth & Nail Records albums
Albums produced by Matt Goldman